John Huntley (born 5 November 1967) is an English former footballer who played as a defender in the Football League for Darlington and in non-league football for Chester-le-Street Town.

Huntley made his Darlington debut as a 17-year-old, in the starting eleven for the visit to York City in the Third Division on 5 October 1985; York won 7–0. He played in five more league matches spread out over the season, four of which were in the starting eleven, and also made one start in the League Cup and one substitute appearance in the Associate Members' Cup.

References

1967 births
Living people
Sportspeople from Chester-le-Street
Footballers from County Durham
English footballers
Association football defenders
Chester-le-Street Town F.C. players
Darlington F.C. players
English Football League players